Louis Haynes (January 17, 1960 – December 22, 2002) was an American football linebacker. He played for the Kansas City Chiefs from 1982 to 1983.

He died on December 22, 2002, in New Orleans, Louisiana at age 42.

References

1960 births
2002 deaths
American football linebackers
Bishop Tigers football players
North Texas Mean Green football players
Kansas City Chiefs players